"Throw That Boy Pussy" is a song, later turned into a viral video that originally was intended as a music video to promote a debut single created by Las Vegas based production company Level Eight Studios for the song of the same name by Fly Young Red. The song released in September 2013, with the said music video premiering in March 2014. The song heavily references homosexual anilingus with many same gender sexual undertones. The song mainly samples Lil Wayne and Trina's "Wowzers" single also released in 2013.

Music video 
The video features male background dancers twerking in a nightclub with Fly Young Red and his friends watching on the other side of the bar drinking and complimenting the male dancers.  The video was filmed in Club XL in Houston. Fly Young Red selected "Throw That Boy Pussy" as his first video release after observing view counts on some pre-release previews of songs from his album.

Critical reception
The provocative lyrics have sparked debate over such social and sexual issues as creative freedom, sexism, and black gay culture. Darnell Moore has described the song as "honest, but not transformative", while Wade Davis has called it "revolutionary". It was plagued with controversy within the African American and hip hop community as the references to the song are not mainly what are associated with the culture.

Gawker describes the song as "the new What What (In the Butt)", and says the song is destined to be a classic, while Dan Savage has referred to it as an "anthem".

See also
"What What (In the Butt)"

General:
LGBT hip hop
African-American culture and sexual orientation

References

External links

2013 songs
American hip hop songs
Viral videos
LGBT-related songs
2013 YouTube videos
Dirty rap songs